Tommy Österlund (born 8 June 1966) is a Swedish rower. He competed in the men's quadruple sculls event at the 1992 Summer Olympics.

References

External links
 

1966 births
Living people
Swedish male rowers
Olympic rowers of Sweden
Rowers at the 1992 Summer Olympics
Sportspeople from Stockholm